Solipet (Village ID 574703) is a village and panchayat in Ranga Reddy district, AP, India. It falls under Shabad mandal. According to the 2011 census it has a population of 1526 living in 376 households. Its main agriculture product is cotton growing.

References

Villages in Ranga Reddy district